Clifton Darryl Webster, Jr. (born October 29, 1986) is an American professional basketball forward.

Early life
Webster was born in Houston, Texas and graduated from Thurgood Marshall High School at Missouri City, Texas in 2004.

College
In 2005, Webster committed with Texas State University–San Marcos. He played nine games with the Texas State Bobcats and averaged 4.6 points per game and 1.8 rebounds. Webster suffered a stress fracture in his left shin as a freshman. In 2006, Webster transferred to the University of Arkansas – Fort Smith and later Houston Community College, from which he earned an associate degree in 2007. Webster did not play basketball at either school.

In 2007, Webster signed with San Jose State University. He played three seasons with the San Jose State Spartans. In 2007–2008, his sophomore season, Webster started all 32 games with averages of 11.3 points, 6.8 rebounds, and 2.1 assists per game. In his junior season of 2008–09, Webster averaged 12.0 points and 6.5 rebounds. However, Webster missed five games due to an eye injury. The NCAA granted Webster a sixth season of eligibility with a medical waiver.

In the 2009–10 season, also classified as a junior, Webster averaged 8.8 points and 4.8 rebounds. With one season of eligibility left and a few classes to complete for his sociology degree, combined with the recent birth of his daughter, Webster decided to declare for the NBA Draft after this season. Webster was not selected in the draft.

Professional career
In January 2011, he signed with the Mount Gambier Pioneers of the South East Australian Basketball League.

In November 2011, Webster joined Bashkimi Prizren of the Kosovar Siguria Superleague. He scored 29 points in his debut game with Bashkimi on November 10, when Bashkimi defeated KB Futura 106–76.

In February 2012, Panteras de Miranda of the Venezuelan Liga Profesional de Baloncesto signed Webster. He was released one month later.

Webster played for the Albany Blazers of the ABA for the 2012–13 season. In 2015, Webster joined the Cleveland Havok of the Universal Basketball Association. In his first game with the  Havok, Webster had 6 points and 3 rebounds.

References

1986 births
Living people
American expatriate basketball people in Australia
American expatriate basketball people in Kosovo
American expatriate basketball people in Venezuela
American men's basketball players
Bashkimi Prizren players
Basketball players from Houston
Panteras de Miranda players
People from Missouri City, Texas
Power forwards (basketball)
San Jose State Spartans men's basketball players
Texas State Bobcats men's basketball players